Confederate Breastworks is a historic breastworks located at Fayetteville, Cumberland County, North Carolina.  The earthen bunkers are located on the grounds of the Fayetteville Veterans Administration Hospital behind the main building. They were built in March 1865 as part of the fortification of Fayetteville by the Confederate army to protect the city against the oncoming forces led by General William Tecumseh Sherman.

It was listed on the National Register of Historic Places in 1985.  It is located in the Fayetteville Veterans Administration Hospital Historic District.

References

Military facilities on the National Register of Historic Places in North Carolina
Buildings and structures in Fayetteville, North Carolina
National Register of Historic Places in Cumberland County, North Carolina
Historic district contributing properties in North Carolina